Marina Fiorato is an Italian-English designer, actress, film producer and author.

Early life 
Fiorato was born in Manchester, with a Venetian father, but was raised in Langcliffe, North Yorkshire.

She studied history at Durham University, before specialising in the study of Shakespeare for a Master's at the University of Warwick. On completing her degrees, she studied art and worked for a period as an illustrator and film reviewer.

Career 
Film and artwork
Fiorato co-produced and starred in the award-winning short film Devilwood (2006), and also appeared in The Wrong Blonde, An Ideal Husband (both 1999), Maybe Baby (2000) and Tuesday (2008). She also designed tour visuals for bands such as U2 and the Rolling Stones and for films including Lara Croft: Tomb Raider.

Publications
Fiorato's first novel, The Glassblower of Murano (2008), was written in bookshop coffee-shops so that she could research the Venetian setting. It was rejected by numerous publishers before being accepted by Beautiful Books Ltd. and becoming an international success. Two years later, Fiorato's The Botticelli Secret (2010) earned a large advance. Her other works also have an Italian theme or setting.

Family life 
Fiorato is married to filmmaker Sacha Bennett and they have two children.

Bibliography
 The Glassblower of Murano (Beautiful Books) (2008) 
 The Madonna of the Almonds (Beautiful Books) (2009)
 The Botticelli Secret (Beautiful Books) (2010) 
 Daughter of Siena (John Murray) (2011)  (US edition The Daughter of Siena, St. Martin's Griffin)
 The Venetian Contract (John  Murray) (2012)  (US edition The Venetian Bargain, St. Martin's Griffin)
 Beatrice and Benedick (St. Martin's Griffin) (2015) 
  Crimson and Bone (2017)

References

External links

Year of birth missing (living people)
Living people
English film producers
English women novelists
English people of Italian descent
Alumni of Durham University
Alumni of the University of Warwick